Ghasi Ram Mahli (17 January 1859 – 1937) was an Indian Nagpuri-language poet. He was a poet under the patronage of Nagvanshi Lal Thakur of Thakurgaon. He was the first poet of the Nagpuri language, whose book was published in 1911.

Early life
He was born in Karkat village of Chanho block in Ranchi district to Bhado ram Mahli and Noni Mahli in a Mahli family.

Works
He was post master, then master. He was a poet. He was given patronage by Nagvanshi Lal Thakur of Thakurgaon.  He was the first poet in the Nagpuri language, whose book was published in 1911. He wrote several poems including "Nag Vanshavali Jhumar",  "Barahamasa", "Vivha Parichhan", "Nagpuri Faag Satak", "Durga Saptasati", "Lalana Ranjana", "Sita Swayambar", "Chandi Puran", "Ram Janam", "Sudama Charitra", "Sundarkand", "Usha Haran", "Nagpuri Fagua Geet", Shiv stuti etc.

References

Indian male poets
1859 births
1937 deaths
People from Ranchi district
Nagpuri-language writers
Nagpuria people